John Foley (1878 – June 1949) was a Welsh rugby union and professional rugby league footballer who played in the 1900s and 1910s. He played club level rugby union (RU) for Newport RFC, and representative level rugby league (RL) for Wales and Welsh League XIII, and at club level for Ebbw Vale, as a forward (prior to the specialist positions of), during the era of contested scrums.

Background
Jack Foley was born in Brynmawr, Wales, and he died aged c. 70–71 in Brynmawr, Wales.

International honours
Jack Foley won 5 caps for Wales in 1908–1911 while at Ebbw Vale 2-tries 4-points, and represented Welsh League XIII while at Merthyr Tydfil in the 14-13 victory over Australia at Penydarren Park, Merthyr Tydfil on Tuesday 19 January 1909.

References

External links
Search for "John Foley" at britishnewspaperarchive.co.uk
Search for "Jack Foley" at britishnewspaperarchive.co.uk

1878 births
1949 deaths
Ebbw Vale RLFC players
Newport RFC players
Rugby league forwards
Rugby league players from Blaenau Gwent
Rugby union players from Blaenau Gwent
Wales national rugby league team players
Welsh League rugby league team players
Welsh rugby league players
Welsh rugby union players